Martin University (originally Martin Center College) is a private college in Indianapolis, Indiana. It was founded by Fr Boniface Hardin, OSB and Jane Edward Schilling, CSJ in 1977 to serve low-income, minority, and adult learners. It is the only Predominantly Black Institution (PBI) of higher education in Indiana.

History
Originally named Martin Center College, the university has always been independent institutionally but grew organizationally out of the Martin Center, a nonprofit human services agency. It was named after both civil rights movement leader Martin Luther King Jr. (died 1968) and St Martin de Porres (died 1639), patron saint of mixed-race people and all those seeking racial harmony.

It is the only Predominantly Black Institution (PBI) of higher education in Indiana. (It is excluded from the designation Historically Black Colleges and Universities (HBCU) because it was founded after the cut off date of 1964.)

The original campus was at 35th Street and College Avenue. It moved to its current location on Avondale Place in the Martindale-Brightwood neighborhood in 1987. Housed initially in a former church and school, the campus grew to include many other structures in the immediate area. 

A $10 million Educational Center and adjoining Peace Garden opened in the summer of 2001. The brick-and-stone Educational Center contains nine classrooms; faculty and staff offices; an 800-seat Gathertorium; a two-story, glass-and-steel globe; a Frederick Douglass Room; student and staff lounges; and a smoking-cessation center.

Academics
Martin University offers 14 undergraduate degrees along with two master's degrees. Popular undergraduate degree programs at the university include Accounting, Addiction Counseling, Business Administration, Biology, Chemistry, Early Childhood Education, Environmental Science, Psychology, Religious Studies, Sociology, Criminal Justice and Liberal Arts. 

Its two graduate degrees are a Master of Arts in Urban Ministries and a Master of Science Community Psychology, the latter designed to prepare candidates for state licensure as a mental health counselor. The university also has special programs in Long-Term Care and Medical Coding. 

Tuition in 2012–13 was $14,180, although 59% of the student body receives financial aid in the average amount of $2,600.

References

External links
Official website

Universities and colleges in Indianapolis
Educational institutions established in 1977
1977 establishments in Indiana
Liberal arts colleges in Indiana
Private universities and colleges in Indiana

African-American Roman Catholic schools
African-American Roman Catholicism